The Willy Brandt Monument in Warsaw is a monument located in Willy Brandt Square, Warsaw, Poland, near the Museum of the History of Polish Jews. It commemorates German chancellor Willy Brandt and the Warschauer Kniefall, Brandt's act of kneeling at a monument to the Warsaw Ghetto Uprising during his visit in 1970.

It was unveiled on 6 December 2000, the day before 30th anniversary of the event, by Chancellor of Germany Gerhard Schröder and Prime Minister of Poland Jerzy Buzek in the presence of Brigitte Seebacher-Brandt and Günter Grass.

The author of the bronze plaque depicting a kneeling Willy Brandt was Wiktoria Czechowska-Antoniewska, and the author of the architectural design of the monument was Piotr Drachal.

Bibliography 

 
 

Monuments and memorials in Warsaw
2000 establishments in Poland
Willy Brandt